Par-e Nobar (also Romanized as Par-e Nobār; also known as Par-e Bonār) is a village in Mashayekh Rural District, Doshman Ziari District, Mamasani County, Fars Province, Iran. At the 2006 census, its population was 150, with a total of 32 families.

References 

Populated places in Mamasani County